Alla mina ansikten (All my faces) is the second studio album by Swedish singer/songwriter Nanne Grönvall, released in April 2001. The album was re-released in March 2002 with a differently arranged track listing and the bonus track "Ett vackert par", a duet with Nick Borgen.

Track listing

References 

2001 albums
2002 albums
Nanne Grönvall albums